Patrick Beegan (26 May 1895 – 2 February 1958) was an Irish Fianna Fáil politician.

He was born in the townland of Oatfield, Cappataggle, County Galway, to John Beegan, a herdsman, and Mary Stephenson.

He was first elected to Dáil Éireann at the 1932 general election when Fianna Fáil first came to power. He was re-elected for various Galway constituencies a further nine occasions. In 1951 he was appointed to the position of Parliamentary Secretary to the Minister for Finance by Éamon de Valera's government. He served in that position until 1954, and was re-appointed in 1957 when Fianna Fáil returned to power. Beegan served in that post until his death on 2 February 1958.

The subsequent by-election to fill Beegan's seat in the Galway South constituency was won by his nephew, Anthony Millar, whose mother, Mary, was Beegan's sister.

References

 

1895 births
1958 deaths
Fianna Fáil TDs
20th-century Irish farmers
Members of the 7th Dáil
Members of the 8th Dáil
Members of the 9th Dáil
Members of the 10th Dáil
Members of the 11th Dáil
Members of the 12th Dáil
Members of the 13th Dáil
Members of the 14th Dáil
Members of the 15th Dáil
Members of the 16th Dáil
People educated at Garbally College
Politicians from County Galway
Parliamentary Secretaries of the 14th Dáil
Parliamentary Secretaries of the 16th Dáil